The Taiwan Power Company Baseball Team, also known as Taipower Baseball Team (Traditional Chinese: 台電棒球隊), is one of the two amateur baseball teams in Taiwan's First Division amateur baseball league that are owned by a government sponsored corporation. It was founded in 1948, and, along with Taiwan Cooperative Bank Baseball Team, have a long tradition of being the two dominant baseball teams in Taiwan's baseball history. At one point, they were known as TCB of the North, Taipower of the South (Traditional Chinese: 北合庫，南台電). Although many of its most prominent players left for professional career after the founding of Chinese Professional Baseball League, and struggled to keep its players on the team, it is still considered one of the best teams in the amateur league. It also has been training some of the best baseball players Taiwan had to offer, and many of them are still valuable players on their current team.s

In 1945, a group of TPC's employees who were enthusiastic of baseball formed the Kaohsiung Power Baseball Team, which would later form the core of Taipower Baseball Team. After many years of development and recruiting many promising players, the team rose to prominence in the amateur league, and was renamed Taipower Baseball Team since its roster included not only players from Kaohsiung, but also other parts of Taiwan. It has since been in virtually every amateur seasons and tournaments, and has won many of them.

See also 
 Taiwan Power Company F.C.

Baseball teams in Taiwan
Taiwan Power Company
1948 establishments in Taiwan
Baseball teams established in 1948